Gaetano is an Italian masculine given name.

Gaetano may also refer to:

 Gaetano (surname), an Italian surname

See also 
 Gaetani (disambiguation)
 San Gaetano (disambiguation)